Kořenov is a municipality and village in Jablonec nad Nisou District in the Liberec Region of the Czech Republic. It has about 900 inhabitants. It lies in the Jizera Mountains.

Administrative parts
The villages of Jizerka, Polubný, Příchovice and Rejdice are administrative parts of Kořenov.

Geography
It lies in the Jizera Mountains and in the eponymous protected landscape area. The Jizera River forms here the entire Czech-Polish border and then shortly crosses the territory of Kořenov.

History
The first settlers came to the remote forested area in northern Bohemia in 1577 when German Paul Schierer (von Walthaimb zu Falkenau) established glassworks at Rejdice. After the 1620 Battle of White Mountain, the lands were seized by Albrecht von Wallenstein, who sold them to the comital Desfours dynasty. The estates were acquired by the noble House of Rohan in 1824.

In 1902, the Tanvald–Kořenov cog railway connecting to the electrified Izera railway line running to Silesian Hirschberg (present-day Jelenia Góra) was put into operation. Until 1918, Bohemian Unter Wurzelsdorf belonged to the Cisleithanian part of the Austro-Hungarian monarchy, in the Bezirk (district) of Gablonz (now Jablonec nad Nisou), one of 94 Bohemian Bezirkshauptmannschaften. A post-office was opened in 1886 named Wurzelsdorf.

The German-speaking village population was expelled after 1945.

The municipality was established in 1960 by the merger of the former market towns of Polubný and Příchovice with Rejdice and Jizerka. Kořenov was only an administrative part of Polubný, however the new municipality adopted its name.

Part of Kořenov, the former hamlet of Údolí Naděje (Hoffnungstal) previously belonged to the Silesian side of the Sudetes, it passed to Czechoslovakia in 1958.

Demographics

Transport
Kořenov lies on the railway line from Liberec to Szklarska Poręba.

Sights

Štěpánka is the oldest observation tower in the Jizera Mountains. It was built on Hvězda mountain in 1847.

Tesařov chapel is a protestant chapel, built according to plans of Otto Bartning in 1909. Today si is used by the Moravian Church.

The Church of Saint John in Polubný was built in 1789–1793. It is a Neoclassical building with Neoromanesque interiors.

The Tanvald–Harrachov cog railway passes through Kořenov. It was built in 1899–1902.

Notable people
Berthold Bartosch (1893–1968), film director
Rudolf Burkert (1904–1985), skier
Claus Josef Riedel (1925–2004), glassmaker
Ladislav Rygl Sr. (born 1947), skier

References

External links

Tanvald–Harrachov cog railway

Villages in Jablonec nad Nisou District